Fabrice Mels (born 17 August 1992 in Sint-Niklaas) is a Belgian professional mountain biker, who specializes in the cross-country eliminator. In 2014, has the world champion in the cross-country eliminator. He is a five-time national champion of this event.  He also won the 2014 UCI XCE World Cup.

References

1992 births
Living people
Belgian male cyclists
Sportspeople from Sint-Niklaas
Cyclists from East Flanders
21st-century Belgian people